Chalcidica pallescens is a moth in the family Cossidae. It was described by Roepke in 1955. It is found in New Guinea and on the Solomon Islands.

References

Natural History Museum Lepidoptera generic names catalog

Zeuzerinae
Moths described in 1955